Santo Domingo is a province of the Dominican Republic. It was split from the Distrito Nacional on October 16, 2001.

Municipalities and municipal districts

As of June 20, 2006, the province is divided into the following  municipalities (municipios) and municipal districts (distrito municipal – D. M.) within them:

Boca Chica
La Caleta (D.M.)
Los Alcarrizos
Palmarejo-Villa Linda (D.M.)
Pantoja (D.M.)
Pedro Brand
La Cuaba (D.M.)
La Guáyiga (D.M.)
San Antonio de Guerra
Hato Viejo (D.M.)
Santo Domingo Este
San Luis (D.M.)
Santo Domingo Norte
La Victoria (D.M.)
Santo Domingo Oeste
Instituto (D.M.)

The following is a sortable table of the municipalities and municipal districts with population figures as of the 2012 census. Urban population are those living in the seats (cabeceras literally heads) of municipalities or of municipal districts. Rural population are those living in the districts (Secciones literally sections) and neighborhoods (Parajes literally places) outside of them.

For comparison with the municipalities and municipal districts of other provinces see the list of municipalities and municipal districts of the Dominican Republic.

References

External links
  Oficina Nacional de Estadística, Statistics Portal of the Dominican Republic
  Oficina Nacional de Estadística, Maps with administrative division of the provinces of the Dominican Republic, downloadable in PDF format

 
Provinces of the Dominican Republic
States and territories established in 2001
2001 establishments in the Dominican Republic